Hillcrest is a village in Brazoria County, Texas, United States. The population was 730 at the 2010 census.

Geography

Hillcrest is located in northeastern Brazoria County at  (29.393222, –95.223406). It is bordered by the city of Alvin to the west.

Demographics

As of the census of 2000, there were 722 people, 262 households, and 221 families residing in the village. The population density was 1,655.7 people per square mile (633.6/km2). There were 271 housing units at an average density of 621.5/sq mi (237.8/km2). The racial makeup of the village was 95.15% White, 0.55% African American, 0.42% Asian, 2.77% from other races, and 1.11% from two or more races. Hispanic or Latino of any race were 5.96% of the population.

There were 262 households, out of which 32.1% had children under the age of 18 living with them, 77.1% were married couples living together, 4.2% had a female householder with no husband present, and 15.3% were non-families. 13.0% of all households were made up of individuals, and 8.4% had someone living alone who was 65 years of age or older. The average household size was 2.76 and the average family size was 3.02.

In the village, the population was spread out, with 23.0% under the age of 18, 6.5% from 18 to 24, 21.7% from 25 to 44, 33.0% from 45 to 64, and 15.8% who were 65 years of age or older. The median age was 44 years. For every 100 females, there were 95.7 males. For every 100 females age 18 and over, there were 90.4 males.

The median income for a household in the village was $63,889, and the median income for a family was $66,563. Males had a median income of $53,214 versus $31,354 for females. The per capita income for the village was $25,055. About 4.5% of families and 5.0% of the population were below the poverty line, including 4.0% of those under age 18 and 4.0% of those age 65 or over.

Education
Hillcrest is in the Alvin Independent School District. It is zoned to Stevenson and Disney Elementary Schools, Alvin Junior High School, and Alvin High School. Previously Hillcrest was zoned to Fairview Junior High School.

Hillcrest is in the taxation zone of Alvin Community College.

References

External links
City of Hillcrest Village official website

Villages in Brazoria County, Texas
Villages in Texas
Greater Houston